Loffredo is an Italian surname. Notable people with the surname include:

Carlo Loffredo (1635–1701), Roman Catholic prelate who served as Archbishop of Capua 
Enrico Loffredo (1507–1547), Roman Catholic prelate who served as Bishop of Capaccio
Todd Loffredo, American veteran professional Table football player

Italian-language surnames